Egaenus is a genus of harvestmen in the family Phalangiidae.

Species
 Egaenus amanensis (Simon, 1884)
 Egaenus asiaticus Roewer, 1914
 Egaenus bajsun Starega, 1979
 Egaenus charitonovi (Gricenko, 1972)
 Egaenus convexus (C.L.Koch, 1835)
 Egaenus diadema Simon, 1885
 Egaenus kashmiricus Caporiacco, 1935
 Egaenus laevipes (Caporiacco, 1935)
 Egaenus marenzelleri Nosek, 1905
 Egaenus montanus Starega, 1979
 Egaenus oedipus (Thorell, 1876)
 Egaenus robustus Kulczynski, in Zichy 1901
 Egaenus rugosus Schenkel, 1963
 Egaenus zichyi Kulczynski, in Zichy 1901

References

Harvestmen
Arachnid genera